Tingsryd is a locality and the seat of Tingsryd Municipality, Kronoberg County, Sweden, with 3,037 inhabitants in 2010.

Sister cities
 Lindström - Minnesota, United States

References 

Populated places in Kronoberg County
Populated places in Tingsryd Municipality
Municipal seats of Kronoberg County
Swedish municipal seats
Värend